EVRY A/S was a Norwegian information technology company that supplies services relating to computing, including operation, outsourcing, and online banking. The company is headquartered in Oslo.  It was established through a merger between EDB Business Partner and ErgoGroup in 2010 and has 10,000 employees at 135 offices in 16 countries. 

In June 2019, Tieto paid EUR 1.2 Bn for the acquisition of EVRY. The new company was named TietoEVRY, and had over 24,000 employees.

History

EDB ErgoGroup ASA was formed in 2010 with the merger of EDB Business Partner and ErgoGroup. Telenor owned most of the shares of ErgoGroup. The company subsequently changed its name to EVRY ASA in April 2012.

In August 2014, EVRY announced that it was initiating a process to investigate strategic opportunities. This was motivated by their assessment of the IT sector in the Nordic countries. In March 2015, Apax Partners became the majority owner of the company, a new board was appointed and it decided to apply for a de-listing from the stock exchange. On 29 October 2015, the company was delisted from the Oslo Stock Exchange.

In August 2015, following the loss of a contract with Norwegian bank DNB, EVRY announced it would lay off 500–550 workers in Norway and Sweden to increase profits, saving NOK 400–500 million (about US$50–60 million). In October 2015, it announced the transfer of a further 600 employees to IBM in an outsourcing deal worth US$1 billion. 

On 13 December 2018, Handelsbanken and EVRY entered into an agreement for the delivery of next-generation core banking and payment services in Finland. The agreement represents a total contract value of approximately NOK 650 million and runs for a period of eight years.

In 2019, it was announced that Evry would merge with Tieto. The merged company TietoEVRY began operations on 2 January 2020.

EVRY India

EVRY acquired Span Infotech, an Indian IT company, which was renamed EVRY India to be coherent with its parent company. EVRY India is a software services company headquartered in Bangalore and Chandigarh and a provider of IT and software product development services to customers based in America and Europe region, operating in  banking and financial services, insurance, healthcare, retail and logistics industries.

In 2016, EVRY announced it would double the manpower at its Indian subsidiary, then at 600 in Mohali and 1,500 in Bengaluru, over three years, investing INR 1–1.25 billion.

In December 2017, the company opened a new branch in Bangalore, at Global Village Tech Park.

References 

Software companies of Norway
Software companies of Sweden
Companies based in Oslo
Norwegian companies established in 2010
International information technology consulting firms
Multinational companies
Outsourcing companies
Apax Partners companies
Norwegian brands